Chary Mamedov (born 12 October 1963) is a Turkmenistan athlete. He competed in the men's discus throw at the 2000 Summer Olympics.

References

1963 births
Living people
Athletes (track and field) at the 2000 Summer Olympics
Turkmenistan male discus throwers
Olympic athletes of Turkmenistan
Place of birth missing (living people)